Confirmation in the Lutheran Church is a public profession of faith prepared for by long and careful instruction. In English, it is called "affirmation of baptism", and is a mature and public  reaffirmation of the faith which "marks the completion of the congregation's program of confirmation ministry".

Scriptural background 
Lutherans, like Roman Catholics, believe that Confirmation is based on Biblical precedents such as Acts of the Apostles 8:14-17:
Now when the apostles in Jerusalem heard that Samaria had accepted the word of God, they sent them Peter and John, who went down and prayed for them, that they might receive the Holy Spirit, for it had not yet fallen upon any of them; they had only been baptized in the name of the Lord Jesus. Then they laid hands on them and they received the Holy Spirit.

Description 
An Explanation of Luther's Small Catechism states: 
Confirmation 
is a public rite of the Church preceded by a period of instruction designed to help baptized Christians identify with the life and mission of the Christian community. Note: Prior to admission to the Eucharist, it is necessary to be instructed in the Christian faith (1 Cor. 11:28). The rite of confirmation provides an opportunity for the individual Christian, relying on God's promise given in Holy Baptism, to make a personal public confession of the faith and a lifelong pledge of fidelity to Christ.

Rite 

The Rite of Confirmation provides an opportunity for the individual Christian, relying on God's promise given in Baptism, to make a personal public profession of the faith and a lifelong pledge of faithfulness to Christ. Confirmation teaches baptized Christians, who wish to become Lutheran, Martin Luther's theology on the Ten Commandments, the Apostles' Creed, the Lord's Prayer, Baptism, Confession, and the Eucharist.

Similar to the Roman Catholic tradition, some Lutheran congregations instruct the very young (such as age 7) in understanding the Eucharist and then receive First Communion before beginning the Confirmation process several years later. (Other Lutheran congregations confirm children at about the 5th grade, or the 8th grade, if they are of the LCMS Lutheran synod, after which they make their first Holy Communion.) At the conclusion of this catechetical instruction, young persons traditionally make a public profession of their faith in a public ceremony. Students often begin taking catechism classes at about age twelve and are usually confirmed at age fourteen. Some Lutheran pastors and theologians are now beginning to ask whether it is permissible to adopt the practice of the Eastern church and to confirm/chrismate at baptism, including infants.

Lutherans do not accept the belief that only a bishop can confirm, as is the custom in the Anglican tradition. Even in countries where Lutherans claim to retain apostolic succession, such as Denmark, Estonia, Finland, Norway and Sweden etc., a pastor is allowed to confirm.

See also 

 Lutheran sacraments
 Confirmation (Catholic Church)

References

External links 
 Christian Questions with Their Answers (Book of Concord)

Martin Luther
Lutheran sacraments and rites